Robert A. Lue (23 May 1964 – 11 November 2020) was a researcher and an academic.

On 1 March 2013, he became the inaugural Richard L. Menschel Faculty Director of the Derek Bok Center for Teaching and Learning at Harvard University.  He was formerly Professor of the Practice of Molecular and Cellular Biology, and the Director of Life Sciences Education at Harvard University. Since 2008, he was the Faculty Director of the Harvard-Allston Education Portal. He was recognized for his contributions to molecular animation.

Lue died on 11 November 2020 of cancer at the age of 56.

Early life and education
Robert Lue grew up in Jamaica, where he said he developed his fascination with the natural world. He is of Chinese and Romanian descent.
Robert Lue graduated from St. George's College in 1980, and went on to graduate from the College of the Holy Cross. After taking a year off to paint at Brandeis University, he went to Harvard to complete a Ph.D in cellular biology.

Notes

1964 births
2020 deaths
People from Queens, New York
Harvard University faculty
College of the Holy Cross alumni
Harvard University alumni
Cell biologists
American animators
American people of Chinese descent
American people of Romanian descent
Scientific animators
Deaths from cancer in New York (state)